The Serra dos Reis State Park is a state park in the state of Rondônia, Brazil.

Location

The Serra dos Reis State Park is divided between the municipalities of Costa Marques (91.17%) and São Francisco do Guaporé (8.83%) in Rondônia.
It is bordered to the north by the Serra dos Reis A State Park.
It lies to the south and east of the BR-429 highway, and to the north of the Guaporé River, which defines the border with Bolivia.
The park is in the central-west Brazilian pediplain and the Parecis plateau.
The park has two support bases for researchers and inspection teams.

History

The Serra dos Reis State Park was created by decree 7.027 of 8 August 1995.
The consultative council was created on 16 June 2002.

In February 2016 it was announced that the federal Ministry of the Environment would include the Serra dos Reis State Park, the Samuel Ecological Station and the Rio Pacaás Novos Extractive Reserve, all in Rondônia, among the conservation areas supported under the Amazon Region Protected Areas Program (ARPA).

Environment

The park is covered by open rainforest.
The flat areas are dominated by open rainforest with many palm trees.
There are areas of denser forest, wetlands that are periodically flooded and terra firma fields higher up.
Biodiversity is low compared to other Amazon areas.
152 species of birds have been identified and 24 species of mammals.

It would look into possible administrative misconduct by SEDAM in the matter.
In January 2016 SEDAM announced findings of illegal activity in the previous quarter in nine units that benefited from ARPA in the state.

Notes

Sources

 
 
 
 
 
 

State parks of Brazil
Protected areas of Rondônia
1995 establishments in Brazil
Protected areas established in 1995